Olaf Fjord (born Ämilian Maximilian Pouch; 3 August 1897 – 19 April 1945) was an Austrian actor, film director and film producer.

Selected filmography
 Der Herzog von Reichstadt (1920)
 Monna Vanna (1922)
 The Ragpicker of Paris (1922)
 Ludwig II (1922) title role
 The Path to God (1924)
 Two People (1924)
 The Stolen Professor (1924)
 The Most Beautiful Woman in the World (1924)
 The Man at Midnight (1924)
 Women Who Fall by the Wayside (1925)
 An Artist of Life (1925)
 Women of Luxury (1925)
 The Company Worth Millions (1925)
 Goetz von Berlichingen of the Iron Hand (1925)
 The Man Sold Himself (1925)
 Change of Heart (1928)
 Madonna of the Sleeping Cars (1928)
 Indizienbeweis (1929)
 The Third Confession (1929)
 Vendetta (1929)
 Erotikon (1929)
 Kamarádské manzelství (1930)
 Tarakanova (1930)
 1914 (1931)
 Kennst Du das Land (1931)
 Kavaliere vom Kurfürstendamm (1932)
 Everything for a Woman (1935)

Bibliography
 Kester, Bernadette. Film Front Weimar: Representations of the First World War in German films of the Weimar Period (1919-1933). Amsterdam University Press, 2003.

External links

1897 births
1945 deaths
Austrian male film actors
Austrian film directors
Austrian film producers
Austrian male silent film actors
Actors from Graz
20th-century Austrian male actors
Film people from Graz